Government Homoeopathic Medical College Kozhikode (GHMC Kozhikode) was the first Graduate Homoeopathic medical college in Asia. The college is affiliated to Kerala University of Health Sciences since 2010. It was affiliated with the University of Calicut till 2010. The facility also includes an on-site hospital.

History 

The college was founded in 1976. It was first situated in Karaparamba, Kozhikode, acquiring a mansion that belonged to the manager of the Pearce Leslie Cashew Factory during the British Raj. The present college building was later constructed in the same area. The original mansion, which was used for many years, was demolished in 2002.

Programmes offered 

The college provides graduate and post graduate courses in Homoeopathy. The graduate course is a Bachelor of Homoeopathic Medicine and Surgery(BHMS). BHMS is a five-and-half-year course with a one-year internship. Post-graduate courses offered include MD(Homeo) in various specialties. The courses are conducted under the auspices of the University of Calicut and are standardized by regulations of the governing body, the Central Council of Homoeopathy, India.

Hospital 

The attached hospital has 125 beds and eight out patient sections. There is a minor operating theater, physiotherapy section and multigym in the hospital. The pain and palliative care unit for terminally ill patients consists of a ward with ten beds. The critical care unit has 10 beds for seriously ill patients.

Ceremonies 
Silver Jubilee of the college was celebrated in 2000–2001 academic year. There was a medical exhibition, and cultural activities.

The first proper Graduation ceremony was conducted in GHMC Kozhikode for graduating interns of 2006, named Aumentare 06 - The Rising.  The interns received scrolls inscribed with a modified Hippocratic oath and the Hahnemannian Oath, and were sworn in as Homoeopaths. The program was conducted by the Intern Doctors Association of the college and hosted by the College Union. The Advocate Syndicate member of the University of Calicut was the chief guest, and Dr. Haroon Ashraf, Secretary to the Intern Doctors Association, presented the reply speech.
There after the ceremony is conducted every year.

GHMC hosted Yuva 08, Inter Medical College Festival in 2008.

References

Homeopathic colleges
Medical colleges in Kerala
Colleges affiliated with the University of Calicut
Kozhikode
Universities and colleges in Kozhikode
Educational institutions established in 1976
1976 establishments in Kerala